The Lincoln metropolitan area may refer to:

The Lincoln, Nebraska metropolitan area, United States
The Lincoln, Illinois micropolitan area, United States

See also
Lincoln (disambiguation)